Mass media in Germany includes a variety of online, print, and broadcast formats, such as radio, television, newspapers, and magazines.

History
The modern printing press developed in Mainz in the 15th century, and its innovative technology spread quickly throughout Europe and the world. In the 20th century period prior and during World War II, mass media propaganda in Nazi Germany was prevalent. Since the 1980s a "dual system of public and commercial" broadcasting has replaced the previous public system.

Books

Magazines

Many in Germany read the weekly Der Spiegel.

Newspapers

As of 2015, widely read national newspapers include Süddeutsche Zeitung, Frankfurter Allgemeine Zeitung, Die Welt, and Bild. "Germans are voracious readers of newspapers and periodicals.... The economic state of Germany's several hundred newspapers and thousands of periodicals is enviably healthy. Most major cities support two or more daily newspapers, in addition to community periodicals, and few towns of any size are without their own daily newspaper."

Bild is the largest highest-selling newspaper in Germany. The paper is published from Monday to Saturday; on Sundays, its sister paper Bild am Sonntag ("Bild on Sunday") is published instead, which has a different style and its own editors. Bild is tabloid in style but broadsheet in size. It is the best-selling European newspaper and has the sixteenth-largest circulation worldwide. Bild has been described as "notorious for its mix of gossip, inflammatory language, and sensationalism" and as having a huge influence on German politicians. Its nearest English-language stylistic and journalistic equivalent is often considered to be the British national newspaper The Sun, the second-highest-selling European tabloid newspaper.

Radio

The first "radio program in Germany was broadcast on October 29, 1923, in Berlin."

Television

Video games
The German video gaming market is one of the largest in the world. The Gamescom in Cologne is the world's leading gaming convention. Popular game series from Germany include Turrican, the Anno series, The Settlers series, the Gothic series, SpellForce, the FIFA Manager series, Far Cry and Crysis. Relevant game developers and publishers are Blue Byte, Crytek, Deep Silver, Kalypso Media, Piranha Bytes, Yager Development, and some of the largest social network game companies like Bigpoint, Gameforge, Goodgame and Wooga.

See also
 Germany: media
 Mass media in Germany by city
 Media in Berlin
 Journalism in Germany
 Cinema of Germany
 Internet in Germany
 Telecommunications in Germany
 German literature
 :Category:East German mass media, 1949–1990

References

This article incorporates information from the German Wikipedia.

Bibliography

External links

 
 

 
Germany
Germany